Oshnuzang (also Romanized as Oshnūzang and Oshnuzeng; also known as Oshnūrang and Shenow Zang) is a village in Lahijan Rural District, in the Central District of Piranshahr County, West Azerbaijan Province, Iran. At the 2006 census, its population was 631, in 104 families.

References 

Populated places in Piranshahr County